WWE King and Queen of the Ring, formerly just King of the Ring, is a professional wrestling pay-per-view (PPV) and livestreaming event produced by WWE, a Connecticut-based professional wrestling promotion. The event centers on the King of the Ring and Queen's Crown tournaments, which are single elimination tournaments for men and women to crown a King of the Ring and Queen, respectively.

The PPV was originally established in 1993 as "King of the Ring" and was held annually in June when the promotion was still called the World Wrestling Federation (WWF, renamed WWE in 2002). It originally only centered on the King of the Ring tournament, which had been held annually as a non-televised house show from 1985 to 1991, with the exception of 1990. During the event's original run as a PPV from 1993 to 2002, it was considered one of the promotion's five biggest events of the year, along with the Royal Rumble, WrestleMania, SummerSlam, and Survivor Series, dubbed the "Big Five."

The 2002 event would be the final King of the Ring produced as a PPV, as in 2003, the event's June PPV slot was replaced by Bad Blood. The event made a one-off return in 2015 but was streamed exclusively on the WWE Network. This would be the final King of the Ring-branded event until its revival in 2023, with this year's event incorporating the Queen's Crown tournament, thus rebranding the event as "King and Queen of the Ring". In addition to livestreaming, the 2023 event returns the event to PPV. The 2023 event will also be held as the ninth WWE event in Saudi Arabia.

After the 2002 event, the tournament endured a four-year hiatus until its return in 2006 as an exclusive tournament for wrestlers of the SmackDown! brand. Instead of a dedicated PPV, however, this tournament concluded at that year's Judgment Day. With the exception of the 2015 King of the Ring event, the tournament has been held periodically as part of WWE's weekly television programs or at other PPV and livestreaming events. To coincide with the brand extension introduced in 2002, the 2002 event featured wrestlers from both the Raw and SmackDown! brand divisions. The brand extension was dissolved in 2011, but it was reintroduced in 2016.

History 
The King of the Ring tournament is a single-elimination tournament in which the winner is crowned the "King of the Ring." The tournament was established in 1985 by the then-World Wrestling Federation (WWF) and was held annually until 1991, with the exception of 1990. These early tournaments were held as special non-televised house shows in an effort to boost attendance at these events.

In 1993, the WWF began to produce an annual June pay-per-view (PPV) titled King of the Ring. The inaugural PPV took place on June 13, 1993, at the Nutter Center in Dayton, Ohio. Unlike the previous non-televised events, the PPV did not feature all of the tournament's matches. Instead, several of the qualifying matches preceded the event with the final few matches then taking place at the pay-per-view. There were also other matches that took place at the event as it was a traditional three-hour pay-per-view. The King of the Ring pay-per-view was considered one of the promotion's "Big Five" PPVs of the year, along with the Royal Rumble, WrestleMania, SummerSlam, and Survivor Series, up until its disestablishment after the 2002 event—it was the only event of the five to never be hosted at least once at Madison Square Garden. In 2003, the event's PPV slot was replaced by Bad Blood. 

In early 2002, the WWF was renamed World Wrestling Entertainment (WWE) following a lawsuit from the World Wildlife Fund over the "WWF" initialism. Also around this time, the promotion introduced the brand extension, in which the roster was divided between the Raw and SmackDown! brands where wrestlers were exclusively assigned to perform. The 2002 tournament and PPV was in turn held for wrestlers from both brands.

After a four-year hiatus, the tournament returned in 2006 and was held exclusively for wrestlers from the SmackDown! brand. Unlike the previous years, however, there was not an associated pay-per-view. Instead, tournament matches took place across episodes of SmackDown! with the finale being held at Judgment Day. While WWE has continued to periodically hold the tournament across their other programs, the semifinals and final of the 2015 tournament aired exclusively as an event on WWE's online streaming service, the WWE Network, which launched in February 2014. It has thus far been the only tournament since 2002 to have its own dedicated event. This 2015 tournament also occurred when a brand extension was not in effect.

In October 2022, Dave Meltzer of the Wrestling Observer Newsletter reported that WWE was planning to resurrect the King of the Ring event in 2023. This was officially confirmed by WWE on March 6, 2023, with the company announcing that the event would be rebranded as "King and Queen of the Ring" to incorporate the women's Queen's Crown tournament that was established in 2021. In addition to its return to PPV, the event will air on WWE's livestreaming platforms, Peacock in the United States and the WWE Network internationally, marking the first time for the event to air on Peacock. It was scheduled for May 27, 2023, and will be the ninth event that WWE will hold in Saudi Arabia under a partnership that WWE began with Saudi Arabia in 2018 in support of Saudi Vision 2030.

Events

References 

1993 establishments in Ohio